The discography of Incognito, a British music band.

Albums

Studio albums

Compilation albums

Remix albums

Live albums

Singles

Videos

Music videos

Video albums

References

External links
  www.incognito.org.uk
 Incognito biography by John Bush, discography and album reviews, credits & releases at AllMusic
 Incognito discography, album releases & credits at Discogs
 Incognito albums to be listened as stream on Spotify

Discographies of British artists
Pop music discographies